Diane R. Williams (December 6, 1947 – August 12, 2016) was an American lawyer who is best known for her part in the landmark sexual harassment case, Williams v. Saxbe. Williams was fired from her job at the U.S. Department of Justice after refusing sexual advances from her boss. She sued in a Washington federal court and won, resulting in the first U.S. District Court ruling that quid pro quo sexual harassment constitutes sex discrimination under the Civil Rights Act of 1964. Williams was a news aide for the Washington Post in the late 1960s and also served as a reporter for the Chicago Tribune. She had a 30-year career as a lawyer.

Biography 
Diane R. Williams was born December 6, 1947 and is a native of Washington, D.C. She graduated from Howard University in 1969 with a B.A. in English and American Literature. She was a national desk news aid for the Washington Post in the late 1960s, and joined the Washington Bureau of the Chicago Tribune in 1970 and became a Metro reporter.

Williams v Saxbe 
Diane Williams began working at the U.S Department of Justice in 1972 as a 23-year-old single mother. She worked in the Justice Department's Community Relations Service as a public information aide, where she was intimately familiar with the racial tensions of the time. Although she had previously been given several positive reviews of her work, she was dismissed from her position at the U.S Department of Justice after filing a complaint about a supervisor Harvey Brinson's unwanted sexual advances. She stated her supervisor's treatment was illegal under the Civil Rights Act of 1964, which bars employers from discriminating against workers on the basis of sex, race, religion, national origin, or color.

After she brought her complaint to the courts, U.S. District Judge Charles R. Richey ordered she receive  $19,147 in compensation, ruling that the Civil Rights Act shields employees from retaliation for refusing their superior's sexual propositions. Williams v. Saxbe was decided on April 20, 1976. The term "sexual harassment" had been coined only a year earlier at Cornell University.

The case was overturned on appeal at the U.S. Court of Appeals in September 1978, after a ruling that the judge had followed improper procedures in the course of reaching his decision. The original case was affirmed on the next appeal.

Williams died of cancer on August 12, 2016.

References 

African-American women lawyers
African-American lawyers
American women lawyers
1947 births
2016 deaths
Lawyers from Washington, D.C.
Chicago Tribune people
Howard University alumni
United States Department of Justice officials
Deaths from cancer in the United States
20th-century African-American people
21st-century African-American people
20th-century African-American women
21st-century African-American women